Blabia colobotheoides is a species of beetle in the family Cerambycidae. It was described by Thomson in 1864. It is known from Colombia and Peru.

References

Blabia
Beetles described in 1864